SS Calgarian was an Allan Line steam turbine ocean liner that was built in 1914 and converted into a Royal Navy armed merchant cruiser. Until 1916 she served with the 9th Cruiser Squadron, patrolling off West Africa and then off the east coast of the United States. She spent the remainder of her career making transatlantic crossings between Canada and Britain.

An Imperial German Navy U-boat sank her off Rathlin Island, Ireland on 1 March 1918. Three torpedoes hit her, and her sinking killed two officers and 47 ratings.

Building
The Fairfield Shipbuilding and Engineering Company built Calgarian at Govan, Glasgow for the Allan Line's primary service between Liverpool, England and the Canadian ports of Quebec and Montreal. She had four screws, each driven by a Parsons-type steam turbine. Her external appearance was similar to an earlier ship built for the line, Alsatian built by William Beardmore and Company, but the ships differed in engineering design details.

She had eleven watertight bulkheads and a double bottom to the turn of the bilge.

Passenger capacity was 200 first class, 500 second class and 1,000 third class, with a crew of 500 officers and men.

The outer port shaft was driven by a high-pressure turbine that exhausted into a medium pressure turbine driving the outer starboard shaft. The two middle shafts, capable of reversal, were each driven by a low-pressure turbine, which in emergencies could each be driven by exhaust from the high-pressure turbine. Each shaft drove a four-bladed bronze propeller for a designed sea speed of 19 knots. Steam was provided by six double-ended and four single-ended forced draft boilers divided between two boiler rooms.

Electrical power was provided by three 250 kW steam-driven generating sets with an 18 kW emergency generator located on the shelter deck above the waterline.

Commercial service
Allan Line registered Calgarian at Glasgow. Her UK official number was 136277 and her code letters were JFDK. She was equipped for wireless telegraphy, operated under contract by the Marconi Company. Her call sign was MJU.

Calgarian made her maiden voyage from Liverpool to Canada on 8 May 1914.

Armed merchant cruiser
On 15 September 1914 the Admiralty requisitioned Calgarian. She was converted into an armed merchant cruiser, armed with eight  guns. By 1 October she had been commissioned. Her pennant number was M54.

Calgarian was assigned to the 9th Cruiser Squadron. From 21 October 1914 until 14 March 1915 she was based at Gibraltar, and patrolled the coast of West Africa. She then crossed the North Atlantic, and from 20 March until 12 June 1915 she was based at Halifax, Nova Scotia. She patrolled mostly off New York, apart from one brief patrol early in April off Chesapeake Bay. She then returned via St John's, Newfoundland and Gibraltar carrying Canadian troops to Liverpool, where she arrived on 10 July 1915. She was then overhauled, firstly in Sandon Dock until 11 August 1915 and Canada Dock from then until 21 August.

Calgarian then went via Bermuda to Halifax, where she was based again from 12 September 1915. Again she patrolled mostly off New York, plus three patrols in February, March and August 1916 off Chesapeake Bay. On 22 August she left Halifax again for Liverpool, where she arrived on 27 August.

Calgarian left Liverpool on 5 October 1916 and reached Halifax on 12 October. She left two days later and reached Devonport, England on 20 October, where her logbook records that "HRH disembarked". The log does not state which royal prince this was.

For the remainder of the war, Calgarian made transatlantic voyages, mostly between Liverpool and Halifax. In July 1917 Canadian Pacific bought Allan Line, including Calgarian, but she remained in Royal Navy service.

She was at Portsmouth, England from 24 August 1917 until 18 October, when she resumed transatlantic duties. She was on a voyage from Liverpool to Halifax when the Halifax Explosion took place on 6 December 1917. When she arrived on 8 December she landed a search party, and the next day she embarked "29 refugees". On 10 December a party of one officer and 30 ratings from Calgarian attended , which was still on fire. A party from Calgarian attended Picton again on 11 December. On 21 December Calgarian left Halifax for Liverpool.

Calgarian spent January 1918 in Scotland at Greenock and Glasgow. Her pennant number weas changed to MI 58. Her surviving logs end on 31 January at Greenock. She then resumed her transatlantic duties.

Loss

On 15 February 1918 Calgarian left Halifax with Convoy HS29. They reached the North Channel and were in sight of Convoy OB50 when  hit her with three torpedoes.

The sloops Anchusa and  detached from OB50: Anchusa trying to depth charge U-19 and Rosemary taking Calgarian in tow. However, the hawser broke, and Calgarian sank north of Rathlin Island with the loss of 49 men.

See also
Henry George Kendall

References

Bibliography

Royal Navy ship names
Ships built on the River Clyde
Ocean liners of the United Kingdom
Steamships of the United Kingdom
World War I Auxiliary cruisers of the Royal Navy
1913 ships
Ships sunk by German submarines in World War I
World War I shipwrecks in the Atlantic Ocean
Maritime incidents in 1918
Protected Wrecks of Northern Ireland
1918 in Ireland
1913 in Scotland
History of County Antrim